The Buckhorn Exchange is a historic landmark restaurant and American frontier museum located in Lincoln Park, Denver, Colorado. The restaurant opened in 1893 and is the oldest continuously operating restaurant in Denver.

It was listed on the National Register of Historic Places in 1983 as the Zeitz Buckhorn Exchange.

History

Buckhorn Exchange was established on November 17, 1893, as a saloon called "The Rio Grande Exchange" by American scout, Henry H. "Shorty Scout" Zietz. Around 1886, the building was constructed by Neef Brothers Brewing Company. Zietz was friends with Buffalo Bill and Sitting Bull who called him "Shorty Scout" due to his small physique. Zietz was considered a lifelong friend to the Indians. The saloon catered toward railroaders, cattlemen, miners, gamblers, businessmen and Indian chiefs.

Theodore Roosevelt dined at the restaurant in 1905 after his Presidential Express train arrived at the Rio Grande rail yards. Roosevelt and Zietz went big-game hunting on Colorado's western slope. The restaurant contains over "500 mounted animals and trophy heads of every description", including an "African Cape Buffalo shot by President Teddy Roosevelt". As of 2018, five presidents have dined at Buckhorn Exchange.

The Daily Meal on Fox News ranked Buckhorn Exchange as one of the oldest operating restaurants in the United States, stating the restaurant received the first liquor license in the state of Colorado.

Buckhorn's is currently owned by Bill Dutton.

Menu
Buckhorn Exchange is a steakhouse and is known for its Rocky Mountain oysters.

See also
 List of the oldest restaurants in the United States
 National Register of Historic Places
 National Register of Historic Places listings in Denver
 List of steakhouses

References

External links

Restaurants established in 1893
Restaurants in Colorado
Restaurants in Denver
Buildings and structures in Denver
National Register of Historic Places in Denver
Restaurants on the National Register of Historic Places
Buildings and structures completed in 1886
Steakhouses in the United States